Bilistiche (Greek: Βιλιστίχη; born c. 280 BC) or Belistiche was a Hellenistic courtesan of uncertain origin. 

According to Pausanias, she was a Macedonian; according to Athenaeus, an Argive (said to descend from the line of Atreus); according to Plutarch, a foreign slave bought from the marketplace. She won the tethrippon and synoris horse races in the 264 BC Olympic Games. She became a mistress of Ptolemy II and they had a son together, Ptolemy Andromachou. After her death Ptolemy II deified her as Aphrodite Bilistiche. Fragmentary papyri from Ankyronpolis dated to 239/8 BC indicate that later in life she was a money lender. According to Clement of Alexandria, she was buried under the shrine of Sarapis in Alexandria.

References

Sources

External links
Chris Bennett - Bilistiche
 Kosmetatou, Elizabeth. "Bilistiche and the Quasi-Institutional Status of Ptolemaic Royal Mistress". Archiv für Papyrusforschung und verwandte Gebiete. Volume 50, Issue 1, Pages 18–36, ISSN (Online) 1867-1551, ISSN (Print) 0066-6459, 2004. 

Hellenistic-era people
Ptolemaic courtiers
Ancient Argives
Ancient Macedonian women
Ancient Olympic competitors
Ancient Macedonian athletes
Ancient Greek chariot racers
3rd-century BC Macedonians
Hetairai
Greek female prostitutes
Deified women
Sportswomen in antiquity
3rd-century BC Greek women
Ancient Greek slaves and freedmen
Royal mistresses